This list includes tournament results for Super Smash Bros. Brawl.

Major tournament results

References

Brawl